Fenaco is an agricultural cooperative federation in Switzerland, headquartered in Bern. Fenaco is an acronym of its French name fédération nationale des coopératives agricoles. Members of the federation are 165 agricultural cooperatives trading under the name Landi as well as some others. This makes Fenaco indirectly owned by the around 43,000 members of the Landi cooperatives, 22,000 of them being active farmers.

Activity 
Fenaco is active in providing products and services to farmers as well as in processing and marketing farmers' products in its retail chains. According to a 2005 article in the Neue Zürcher Zeitung, Fenaco has a "dominant role in many agricultural sectors". In 2009, it was placed on position 172 of the Deloitte list of the world's largest 250 producers of consumer goods, although it operates only in Switzerland.

Enterprises or labels of Fenaco are the beverage company Ramseier Suisse, meat producer Ernst Sutter AG, the retailers Volg (small supermarkets) and Landi, fertiliser retailer Landor, animal feed producer UFA AG, and mineral oil company Agrola. As these names are better known to the general public than Fenaco who owns them, it has also been called "the silent giant". Altogether, Fenaco owns 80 subsidiary companies. Swiss trade union Syna has a "social partnership" (a term for a cooperative relationship between trade unions and employer's associations) with Fenaco.

Fenaco has over 11,000 employees and in 2021 had a sales revenue of 7.3 billion Swiss francs.

History 
Fenaco was founded in 1993 as a merger of six existing agricultural cooperative federations with roots in the late 19th century.

References

External links 
 

Cooperatives in Switzerland
Cooperative federations
Retail companies established in 1993
1993 establishments in Switzerland
Food cooperatives
Companies based in Bern